Michigan's 12th congressional district is a U.S. congressional district in Michigan.

The district was first created during the reapportionment and redistricting after the 1890 Census. From 2003 to 2013 it was located in Detroit's inner suburbs to the north, along the Interstate 696 corridor in Macomb and Oakland counties, as well as a portion of Macomb north of the corridor. District boundaries were redrawn in 1993, and 2003 due to reapportionment following the censuses of 1990 and 2000. After Michigan's congressional map was redrawn in 2022, the 12th lost Ann Arbor and most of its suburbs, and was re-centered around the cities of Detroit and Dearborn.

During the 113th Congress (2013 to 2015), the district was represented by John Dingell (D). He was a Congressman for this and other districts for a total of 59 years, making him the longest-serving member of Congress in US history. He was succeeded by his wife Debbie Dingell, who currently represents the district the 6th congressional district. The current district is represented by Democrat Rashida Tlaib, who had previously represented the old 13th district.

Cities since 2023

 Beverly Hills
 Bingham Farms
 Detroit (portions)
 Dearborn
 Dearborn Heights (portions)
 Franklin
 Garden City
 Inkster
 Lathrup Village
 Livonia
 Redford Township
 Southfield 
 Westland

Election results from presidential races 
In recent times, the district has voted consistently for the Democratic Party candidate in presidential races.

Election results from statewide races

List of members representing the district

Recent election results

2012

2014

2016

2018

2020

2022

Historical district boundaries

See also
Michigan's 12th congressional district Democrat committee
Michigan's 12th congressional district Republican committee
Michigan's congressional districts
List of United States congressional districts

References

12
Constituencies established in 1893
1893 establishments in Michigan